William J. Fritz is an American geologist and academic administrator who served as the president of the College of Staten Island. Fritz was appointed interim president on August 15, 2012 and assumed the role in a permanent capacity on May 6, 2014, retiring as of December 31, 2021.

Education 
Fritz earned a Bachelor of Science and Master of Science in biology from Walla Walla College and a PhD in geography from the University of Montana.

Career 
Fritz has worked as a field geology, specializing in the sedimentation and tectonics of Yellowstone County, Montana; England; Ireland; and Wales. After graduate school, Fritz joined the faculty of the Amoco Production Company. He also worked as a professor of geology at Georgia State University. He eventually became director of freshmen studies in the College of Liberal Arts and Sciences and senior associate provost for academic programs and enrollment services. Fritz joined the College of Staten Island as interim president in 2012. He became the school's permanent president on May 6, 2014.

References 

 

Walla Walla University alumni
University of Montana alumni
American geologists
Georgia State University faculty
College of Staten Island faculty
Living people
Year of birth missing (living people)